"Memphis Soul Stew" is a song by American saxophonist and bandleader King Curtis (1934–1971). 

The track is a narrative that describes the Stax Records sound in terms of a cooking recipe, with each instrument introduced by Curtis. This includes "fatback drums", "a pinch of organ" and "a half-pint of horns".

The original studio version was released as a single on Atco Records in 1967, and became a top 50 hit. A live version, recorded at the Fillmore West in 1971, shortly before Curtis' death, was released on his live album Live at Fillmore West. 

In 2008, Bill Bailey chose the song to appear on Desert Island Discs.

Jazz saxophonist Michael Lington covered the track on his 2014 album Soul Appeal.

References

1967 songs